Mount Masley is a prominent flat-topped summit,  high, in the narrow, northern part of Pain Mesa, situated  east of Silva Ridge in the Mesa Range, Antarctica. It was mapped by United States Geological Survey from surveys and U.S. Navy air photos, 1960–64, and was named by the Advisory Committee on Antarctic Names for Andrew J. Masley, an ionospheric physics scientist at McMurdo Station, summer 1962–63.

References

Mountains of Victoria Land
Pennell Coast